The Ibasresito is a stream in Bolivia in the Beni Department.

References

External links 

 Map of the rivers of the Beni Department (University of Texas) 

Rivers of Bolivia